Athletics was a sport at the inaugural Afro-Asian Games in 2003 in Hyderabad, India. The second Games were planned for 2007 but they have been indefinitely postponed.

Editions

References

Afro-Asian Games. GBR Athletics. Retrieved 2019-09-12.

 
Athletics
Afro-Asian Games
Afro-Asian Games
Afro-Asian Games